Punctodendrolaelaps formicarius is a species of mite first found in Finland.

References

Rhodacaridae
Animals described in 2010